{{Infobox film
| name           = Lucky Night
| image          = Poster of Lucky Night.jpg
| image_size     =
| caption        = Theatrical release poster
| director       = Norman Taurog
| producer       = Louis D. Lighton
| based_on       = {{based on|Lucky Night1935 story in Collier's|Oliver Claxton}}
| screenplay     = Vincent LawrenceGrover Jones
| narrator       =
| starring       = Robert TaylorMyrna Loy
| music = Franz Waxman
| cinematography = Ray June
| editing        = Elmo Veron
| studio         = Metro-Goldwyn-Mayer 
| distributor    = Loew's Inc.
| released       =  
| runtime        = 82 minutes
| country        = United States
| language       = English
| budget         = $589,000
| gross          = $1,080,000
}}Lucky Night'' (1939) is a comedy movie from MGM starring Robert Taylor and Myrna Loy, directed by Norman Taurog.

Plot  
Two people meet in a park (Cora, played by Myrna Loy, and William "Bill" Overton, played by Robert Taylor). They become acquainted and each discovers that the other is also poor. They try to get 50 cents to eat at a restaurant but a man complains to the police. They convince a policeman to give them 50 cents by saying that they are engaged (which they are not).

While walking, they drop the money without knowing it. When their restaurant bill comes to 50 cents, they suddenly realize they must have lost it. Someone leaves a coin on the table, Bill tells Cora to steal it, which she does. Bill spots a slot machine in the restaurant and tells Cora to gamble, which she does and wins. Bill and Cora go to a casino, win a car in a game and make more money gambling.

The two get drunk and wake up to find out they are married. Bill gets a job but still gets the urge to gamble; Cora doesn't care to live that life, so she leaves Bill and goes back to her father. Bill goes to her house to get her back and he succeeds.

Credited cast  
 Robert Taylor as William 'Bill' Overton 
 Myrna Loy as Cora Jordan Overton 
 Joseph Allen as Joe Hilton  
 Henry O'Neill as H. Calvin Jordan, Cora's father 
 Douglas Fowley as George, Bill's friend 
 Bernard Nedall as 'Dusty' Sawyer 
 Charles Lane as Mr. Carpenter, Paint Store Owner 
 Bernadene Hayes as Blondie, Clerk at Carpenters  
 Gladys Blake as Blackie, Clerk at Carpenters 
 Marjorie Main as Mrs. Briggs, the Land Lady 
 Edward Gargan as Police Man in Park 
 Irving Bacon as Bus Conductor 
 Oscar O'Shea as Lieutenant Murphy

Box office
According to MGM records the film earned $716,000 in the US and Canada and $364,000 elsewhere resulting in a profit of $126,000.

References

External links
 
 
 
 

Metro-Goldwyn-Mayer films
Films directed by Norman Taurog
1939 films
1939 comedy films
American black-and-white films
American comedy films
1930s English-language films
1930s American films